is a video game series for the Nintendo's Wii console based on the popular manga and anime One Piece. The game was released in two episodes which act as parts of a single story.
The first episode  was released in Japan on September 11, 2008. Later it was released in Europe on June 19, 2009 and in Australia on June 25, 2009 respectively. The second episode  was released in Japan on February 26, 2009, and was later released in Europe on September 25, 2009 and in Australia on October 1, 2009 respectively. Neither game was released in North America.

It was additionally released as One Piece Unlimited Cruise: Double Pack in Germany on June 25, 2010, which contains both of the European games within separate boxes.

Another version of the game, containing both episodes, was released on the Nintendo 3DS in Japan with the name  on May 26, 2011. In Europe, the 3DS game was once again split into two releases, with episode 1 released as One Piece: Unlimited Cruise SP on February 10, 2012, and episode 2 as One Piece: Unlimited Cruise SP 2 on July 27, 2012.

Unlike the predecessor, One Piece: Unlimited Adventure, One Piece: Unlimited Cruise was localised by only in PAL regions and the PAL versions only have Japanese voices with multi-lingual subtitles (including English) instead of English voices.

It was followed by a sequel One Piece: Unlimited World Red which was released on  Nintendo 3DS, PlayStation 3, PlayStation 4, PlayStation Vita, Wii U, Nintendo Switch and Microsoft Windows.

Playable characters
Story Mode
In the story mode, all of the Straw Hat Pirates as current are playable. The game has Nightmare Luffy, which was a state of Monkey D. Luffy when a hundred shadows extracted from victims of Moriah were inserted into him and gave him gigantic strength and his body became several times bigger than his normal self and his skin turned completely blue. He was roughly the same size as Moriah and his body was similar to Chopper in Heavy Point. Luffy also talked differently, losing his usual carefree tone and instead speaking with a grim seriousness.

Costume themes
Much like in One Piece: Unlimited Adventure, all of the main characters get new costumes (though where the costumes came from isn't mentioned) and each costume has an animal based theme. Early screenshots of Brook showed him dressed in his normal clothes, but he was later revealed to have his own animal themed costume. Later scans also revealed that Zoro's costume included his new katana Shusui. After beating the game once, the player can switch all of the characters costumes from the animal themed to the clothes they normally wear (clothing from Thriller Bark Arc) and their attack style.

Reception

It has a score of 67% on Metacritic. IGN awarded it a score of 6.8 out of 10, saying "As it stands right now, One Piece will most certainly satisfy fans of the anime/manga, but won't reach too many players beyond that."

Notes

References

External links
Namco Bandai's official website 
Ganbarion's official website 

2008 video games
2009 video games
Episodic video games
Ganbarion games
Multiplayer and single-player video games
Nintendo 3DS games
Unlimited Cruise
Shueisha franchises
Video games developed in Japan
Wii games